Dara Shikoh Garden is a Mughal garden situated on a side of Bijbehara, Pahalgam  road which is 45 km away from the capital Srinagar. It is situated on the bank of the river Jehlum. It constitutes centuries-old  Chinar  trees which were planted by the Mughal emperors which they brought from Iran and that is why it is also known as Town of Chinars.

History
Dara Shikoh a Mughal Emperor and the eldest son of the fifth king of Mughals Shah Jahan built the garden in the early 17th century and was opened on 1640 A.D.

References

Mughal gardens in India
Gardens in Jammu and Kashmir
Tourist attractions in Anantnag district